The Buck Apartment Building is a building located in northwest Portland, Oregon listed on the National Register of Historic Places.

See also
 National Register of Historic Places listings in Northwest Portland, Oregon

References

1910 establishments in Oregon
Buildings designated early commercial in the National Register of Historic Places
Individually listed contributing properties to historic districts on the National Register in Oregon
National Register of Historic Places in Portland, Oregon
Northwest Portland, Oregon
Portland Historic Landmarks
Residential buildings completed in 1910